Roger I  may refer to:
In chronological order
 Roger I of Carcassonne (died 1012), Count of Carcassonne
 Roger I of Tosny, Norman noble
 Roger I "de Berkeley" (died 1093), Norman noble, possibly the son of Roger I of Tosny - see Baron Berkeley
 Roger I of Sicily (1031–1101), Norman ruler of Sicily
 Roger I Trencavel (died 1150), Viscount of Albi, Carcassonne, and Razès
 Roger I of Fézensaguet (1190–1245), Viscount of Fézensaguet